National Highway 907A, commonly called NH 907A is a national highway in  India. It is a branch of National Highway 7. NH-907A traverses the state of Himachal Pradesh in India.

Route 
Nahan - Banethi - Sarahan - Kumarhatti .

Junctions  
 
  Terminal near Nahan.
  Terminal near Kumarhatti.

See also 
 List of National Highways in India
 List of National Highways in India by state

References  

National highways in India
National Highways in Himachal Pradesh